Aleš Kotalík (born 23 December 1978) is a former professional ice hockey right winger, who is Assistant GM for HC Mountfield České Budějovice of the Czech Extraliga.

Playing career
Kotalík was drafted 164th overall by the Buffalo Sabres in the 1998 NHL Entry Draft. In the 2005–06 NHL season, he had a career high in 25 goals, 37 assists and 62 points. The recent 2006–07 NHL season he was 5 for 7 in shootouts and second in the NHL with four shootout deciding goals. He was out for 16 games because of an injured right knee. In the Calgary Flames All-Star games, he showed his ability to strike hard with a slap shot speed of 105.3 being the second hardest shooter in the NHL.

On 4 March 2009, Kotalík was traded by the Sabres to the Edmonton Oilers in exchange for a 2nd round pick in the 2009 NHL Entry Draft.  Kotalík finished the season in Edmonton before being signed as a free agent by the New York Rangers on 9 July 2009 to a three-year, $9 million contract. Due to his lack of goal scoring, which he was expected to bring and being a healthy scratch for numerous games, he was traded on 1 February 2010 to the Calgary Flames along with Chris Higgins in exchange for Olli Jokinen and Brandon Prust.

Placed on waivers in the off-season by the Calgary Flames, Kotalík cleared waivers on 29 June 2010. At the time, he had two years and $6 million remaining on his contract. On 27 January 2011, he was placed back on waivers by the Flames and subsequently assigned to the Abbotsford Heat of the American Hockey League. On 25 June, along with Robyn Regehr and a second round 2012 draft pick, Kotalík was traded back to the Sabres for Paul Byron and Chris Butler.

On 24 September 2011, Kotalík was placed on waivers by the Buffalo Sabres in a salary cap move. After initially reporting to the Rochester Americans, Kotalík instead returned to his hometown in the Czech Republic to play for HC Mountfield České Budějovice.

International play

Kotalík played his first game for the national team in 2000, and has played 21 times for the Czech national team including the 2006 Winter Olympics and the 2008 and 2009 World Championships.

Career statistics

Regular season and playoffs

International

References

External links

1978 births
Abbotsford Heat players
Buffalo Sabres draft picks
Buffalo Sabres players
Calgary Flames players
Czech ice hockey right wingers
Edmonton Oilers players
HC Bílí Tygři Liberec players
KLH Vajgar Jindřichův Hradec players
Motor České Budějovice players
Ice hockey players at the 2006 Winter Olympics
Olympic ice hockey players of the Czech Republic
Medalists at the 2006 Winter Olympics
Olympic medalists in ice hockey
Olympic bronze medalists for the Czech Republic
New York Rangers players
Rochester Americans players
People from Jindřichův Hradec
Living people
Sportspeople from the South Bohemian Region
Czech expatriate ice hockey players in Canada
Czech expatriate ice hockey players in the United States